Craig is an unincorporated community in Guernsey County, in the U.S. state of Ohio.

History
A post office called Craig was established in 1890, and remained in operation until 1909. Besides the post office, Craig had a country store.

References

Unincorporated communities in Guernsey County, Ohio
Unincorporated communities in Ohio